Pabna Sadar is an upazila of Pabna District in the Division of Rajshahi, Bangladesh.

Geography
It has 74517 households and total area 443.9 km2.

Demographics
According to the [[2016  Census]], Pabna Sadar had a population of 431,513,  of whom 215,133 were aged 18 or over. Males constituted 51.76% of the population, and females 48.24%. Pabna Sadar had an average literacy rate of 29.1% (7+ years), against  the national average of 32.4%.

Administration
Pabna Sadar Upazila is divided into Pabna Municipality and ten union parishads: Ataikola, Bharara, Char Tarapur, Dapunia, Dogachhi, Gayeshpur, Hemayetpur, Malanchi, Maligachha, and Sadullahpur. The union parishads are subdivided into 259 mauzas and 291 villages.

Pabna Municipality is subdivided into 15 wards and 46 mahallas.

Chairman: Mosharrof Hossain

Vice Chairman:

Woman Vice Chairman:

Upazila Nirbahi Officer (UNO): Salma Khatun

References

Upazilas of Pabna District